Wages of Sin is the fourth studio album by Swedish melodic death metal band Arch Enemy. It is the first Arch Enemy album to feature the vocals of Angela Gossow. It is also the first album they use Standard-C tuning, which they still use today. It was released on 25 April 2001 in Japan, but the European and American releases were delayed to 18 March 2002.

Reception

Wages of Sin was well received by most critics, who praised the new singer Angela Gossow. Blake Jessop of Blistering said that she handles the vocals on the album expertly. But he wrote that "while less diverse than Liiva, the diminutive German's more traditional death metal style gives Wages an uncommonly brutal, if slightly less creative air." Jessop also states the album "musically, it is predictably brilliant". 

Dennis of Lords of Metal said that "the female vocals by Angela Gossow are a remarkable performance" and that it was a big improvement compared to the former singer Johan Liiva. 
Jeff of Metal Storm stated that "with Wages of Sin, Arch Enemy delivers to us one of the best albums of the year 2002 and proves us by the same opportunity that girls are not relegated to only sing in atmospheric and gothic metal." 

Ty Brookman and Jon Eardley of Metal Review was surprised with the Gossow vocals. Brookman commented that when he heard that Arch Enemy would a female singer, his first reaction was "career suicide", but after to listen to the album, he changed his mind stating that "Gossow delivers a vocal tirade that rivals any male vocalist." Brookman praised the band, however, he said about the album that there are elements that seem lacking in a few places. Eardley said that this album has "one of the best vocal performances of 2001" and that it "is a true masterpiece." 

Chris Flaaten of Chronicles of Chaos wrote that "the album has their best production to date and variety is abundant" and that the band found what they needed in Gossow. Despite Serge Regoor of Archaic Magazine states that her voice sounds great, he comments that "actually the vocals are much better too, but they are still not as good compared to the guitarwork." 

Haavard Holm of Tartarean Desire praised the band writing that it "has capacities beyond the normal" and stated that "Wages of Sin is simply so well done in all ways, that it will be hard for any band to overcome this album in this genre." Another critic of Tartarean Desire, Vincent Eldefors, praised the singer Angela Gossow stating that she is one of the best lead vocalists in extreme metal along ex-Opera IX Cadaveria. Adam Bregman of AllMusic wrote that Gossow "is just the right touch to add to a band who ranks among metal's most progressive and unique outfits."

Blabbermouth.net's Borivoj Krgin praised the production of the album calling it "most impressive production job out of all the Arch Enemy albums." El Cid of Metal Rules praised the band stating that "this is arpeggio heaven amongst other things, the drumming is tight, the bass is excellent and the guitars are simply magnificent." 

Jeff of Metal Storm liked of quality of the production and praised the songs and the musicians calling it of "simply excellent" and "simply brilliant", respectively. He said that "the Amott brothers are certainly among the best guitarists of today's metal scene."

Accolades
Wages of Sin won a Burrn! magazine award in the category Best Album.

Track listing
Writing credits adapted from album booklet.

All lyrics written by Michael Amott, except where noted; all music written by Christopher Amott and Michael Amott, except where noted.

The first pressing of this album contains a bonus CD titled A Collection of Rare & Unreleased Songs from the Arch Enemy Vault. These songs feature the band's previous vocalist, Johan Liiva.

Personnel

Arch Enemy
 Angela Gossow – vocals
 Michael Amott – guitars, production, layout
 Christopher Amott – guitars
 Sharlee D'Angelo – bass
 Daniel Erlandsson – drums

Production 
 Fredrik Nordström − production, engineering
 Arch Enemy − engineering
 Per Wiberg − Mellotron, grand piano, keyboards
 Johan Liiva – vocals (on second disc)
 Andy Sneap – mixing, mastering
 Cabin Fever Media − artwork, layout
 Branko − band photography
 Adde − band photography

References

External links
 Wages of Sin at Encyclopaedia Metallum

2001 albums
Arch Enemy albums
Albums produced by Fredrik Nordström
Albums recorded at Studio Fredman
Century Media Records albums